Damghan County is in Semnan province, Iran. The capital of the county is the city of Damghan. At the 2006 census, the county's population was 81,993 in 23,020 households. The following census in 2011 counted 86,908 people in 25,554 households. At the 2016 census, the county's population was 94,190 in 30,296 households.

Administrative divisions

The population history and structural changes of Damghan County's administrative divisions over three consecutive censuses are shown in the following table. The latest census shows two districts, six rural districts, and four cities.

City and towns
The Ali Spring (Cheshmeh-ye Ali) is located there, not be confused with the Cheshmeh-ye Ali in Rey, south Tehran. Amirabad District forms the major part of the county. The three cities are Damghan, Dibaj and Amiriyeh.

Other important villages in the county are: Mehmandust, Naimabad, Tazareh, Tuyeh & Darvar, Qusheh, Hasanabad, and Rashm.

History
The area suffered damage in the 856 Damghan earthquake.

Tourist attractions
Damghan city itself has many ancient and historical places. However outside the city also there are some attractions like:
 Toghrol Tower in Mehmandust
 Ali Spring (Cheshmeh Ali) and its fort
 Dibaj, Sarcheshmeh and Imamzadeh
 Abbasi Carvansaray
 Gerd Kuh
 Mansurkuh and Mehrnegar
 Cheshmeh & Tom of Baba Ali in north of Naim Abad
 Dam on Damghan River
 Dasht-e Kavir

Transportation
Main Tehran-Mashhad railway is 5 km south of Damghan. Damghan is alongside of Tehran-Mashhad Highway.
From south there is main road to Isfahan and Yazd, and northward from Ali Spring (Cheshmeh Ali) & Tuyeh Darvar to Sari and through Dibaj to Behshahr & Gorgan.

See also
 Amiriyeh
 Battle of Damghan (1447)
 Battle of Damghan (1729)
 Damghan
 Dibaj
 Hecatompylos (Shahr-e Qumis)
 Semnan Province

References

External links
   Damghan News Agency

 

Counties of Semnan Province